Marry Me is an American television sitcom that originally aired on NBC from October 14, 2014, to February 17, 2015. The remaining 4 episodes aired on Channel 4. The series stars Casey Wilson and Ken Marino and aired Tuesday nights at 9 pm (ET/PT)/8 pm (CT) as part the 2014–15 television season. Marry Me was created and executive produced by David Caspe with co-executive producers/director Seth Gordon and Jamie Tarses for Sony Pictures Television.

Series creator David Caspe loosely based the premise on his recent marriage to actress Casey Wilson, who stars as Annie. Like Caspe's previous sitcom Happy Endings, this series is set in Chicago.

On November 5, 2014, the series order was upped to 18 episodes for its first season. On February 17, 2015, the show aired its final episode before being removed from the schedule to allow The Voice to air two-hour episodes for three weeks, before Undateable took over the timeslot for the remainder of the season - leaving four episodes of Marry Me unaired. These episodes later began premiering in the UK from April 23, 2015 to May 14, 2015.

On May 8, 2015, NBC cancelled the series after one season. The show was eventually released on a complete series DVD on February 16, 2017.

Premise
This series follows what happens to longtime couple – high-strung Annie (Casey Wilson) and easy-going Jake (Ken Marino) – when their deeply committed relationship turns into a long and bumpy ride on the way to the altar after the question of "Will You Marry Me?" is popped. After six years together, the couple struggles with trying to decide whether a whirlwind of big fights and botched marriage proposals spells doom for their relationship, when instead they discover a series of "signs" that they think means they are meant for each other.

Faced with proposals gone awry and a string of other unfortunate coincidences, Annie and Jake find themselves destined to be together whether they can get it together or not.

Cast

Main
 Casey Wilson as Annie Fletcher Schuffman – Jake's fiancée and eventually wife, described as emotionally volatile and over-dramatic, in contrast to the more laid-back Jake. Now that Annie and Jake are engaged and living together, she's had a hard time getting adjusted to life as "engagedlyweds" and because of her emotional nature, she often gets easily stressed out, most notably when dealing with things such as when Jake moves in with her, getting along with Jake's mother, and having to host the family Thanksgiving for the first time as a couple. At the conclusion of the series, Annie finds out she's technically a Canadian and after failing her citizenship test to become an official American citizen, she has to quickly marry Jake before she's deported from the country.
 Ken Marino as Jake Schuffman – Annie's fiancé and eventual husband, described as the more rational and level-headed in the couple, he is often forgiving of Annie's quirks and over-dramatic behavior. Now that Annie and Jake are engaged and living together, Jake tries to put Annie at ease during her constant freaking out over getting married and often has to act as a peacemaker between Annie and his mom, while also attempting to get to know Annie's dads better. Jake was previously engaged to a woman named Fantasia Yang, but called it off after he realized she was insane.
 John Gemberling as Gil – Jake's mopey, depraved and divorced best friend who sells hair loss products. His friends are often concerned about him, as his life has mostly been a mess ever since his wife recently left him. It has also been shown that Gil relies too much on Jake as a friend, as the gang has made attempts to help Gil be less dependent on Jake.
 Sarah Wright Olsen as Dennah – Annie's proudly single best friend who works as a pre-school teacher. She is said to have a "take it or leave it" attitude toward marriage.
 Tymberlee Hill as Kay – Annie and Jake's lesbian friend and neighbor. Kay is shown to be sarcastic and eccentric, and often makes references to past romantic flings, such as hook-ups she made on "Boobr", a dating app for lesbians. Her full name is Kay Sedia (pronounced exactly like "quesadilla"). Kay has her first longterm relationship with a woman she meets named Hailey, after trying to keep their relationship a secret at first.
 Dan Bucatinsky as Kevin 2 (episode 8, 10-18; previously recurring guest) – One of Annie's gay dads, both named Kevin. It's been said that Annie got her dramatic side from dads, who named her after the famous Broadway musical. Like Annie, the Kevins are also newly engaged.
 Tim Meadows as Kevin 1 – One of Annie's gay dads, both named Kevin. Both of "The Kevins" often argue which one of them is her biological father, despite the obvious fact that "Kevin One" is African-American and Annie is white. Like Annie, the Kevins are also newly engaged.

Recurring cast
 JoBeth Williams as Myrna Schuffman – Jake's widowed mom, who Annie is having trouble connecting with. The controlling, type-A personality Myrna usually clashes with Annie over just about everything.
 Jessica St. Clair as Julie – Annie's nemesis who lives down the hall from her. Described as a "Pilates-obsessed, super-mom" who always knows how to make Annie feel inferior. Jake and Annie get Julie to officiate their wedding when they have to throw a last-minute wedding.
 Danielle Schneider as Cassie – Gil's ex-wife, who he's recently separated from. Unlike Gil, she's doing just fine without him and has no desire to get back together.
 Crista Flanagan as Libby Berman – Annie and Jake's friend who recently had a baby. When they attended her baby shower, they couldn't remember the first name of her fertility specialist husband.
 Jerry O'Connell as Daniel – An old friend of Jake's who doesn't like Annie and tries to break them up. He is the leader of Jake's old group of friends known as "The Boyz", along with Gut Boy and Matthew. They later return to perform the music at Annie and Jake's wedding.
 Steve Little as Gut Boy – Member of Jake's old group of friends known as "The Boyz", along with Daniel and Matthew. They later return to perform the music at Annie and Jake's wedding.
 Brandon Johnson as Matthew – Member of Jake's old group of friends known as "The Boyz", along with Daniel and Gut Boy. They later return to perform the music at Annie and Jake's wedding.
 Ana Ortiz as Hailey – Kay's first ever steady girlfriend. She's been keeping their relationship a secret until she was busted by Dennah and Gil.
 Rob Huebel as Wes – Annie and Dennah's yoga instructor. Dennah appears to be his favorite student, while Annie appears to be his least favorite student, as he usually has a hard time finding ways to compliment her in class and often can't remember her name. At one point, Dennah started to date Wes when she was desperate to find a date to bring to the wedding.

Connections to Happy Endings

It has been implied that David Caspe's previous sitcom Happy Endings, which aired on ABC from 2011 to 2013, exists in the same universe as Marry Me. Both shows are set in Chicago and Derrick, a recurring character played by Stephen Guarino, appears on both shows.

Three of the original six series regulars – Casey Wilson, Ken Marino and Sarah Wright Olsen – also appeared on Happy Endings, albeit in different roles. John Gemberling also appeared on Happy Endings, however as his character wasn't named — he was merely credited as 'Thief' — it is unclear whether the two characters are considered separate people. In addition, several guest stars on Marry Me — including Rob Huebel, Rob Riggle, Nat Faxon and Ryan Hansen — also had guest appearances as different characters on Happy Endings.

Episodes

International broadcast

The series premiered in the United Kingdom on E4 on 15 January 2015.
The series premiered in Australia on the 7flix on 12 June 2017. The series premiered in New Zealand on TV2 (New Zealand) on 11 February 2015. It was telecast in India on Comedy Central India in May, 2015.

Reception

Critical reception
Season 1 of Marry Me has received generally positive reviews. Rotten Tomatoes gives the show a rating of 78%, based on 51 reviews, with an average rating of 7.1/10. The site's consensus states, "Marry Mes premise may be simple, but the talents of stars Casey Wilson and Ken Marino – and a top-notch supporting cast – push it past other rom-coms." On Metacritic, the show has a score of 63 out of 100, based on reviews from 25 critics, indicating "generally favorable reviews", some critics made favorable comparisons to the series Mad About You.

U.S. ratings

References

External links
 
 

2014 American television series debuts
2015 American television series endings
2010s American LGBT-related comedy television series
2010s American romantic comedy television series
2010s American single-camera sitcoms
English-language television shows
NBC original programming
Television series by Sony Pictures Television
Television shows set in Los Angeles
Wedding television shows